Alfred Lee Donaldson (1866–1923) was a New York City banker who moved to Saranac Lake, New York in February 1895, to be treated for tuberculosis by Dr. Edward Livingston Trudeau. With two other men in the same circumstances he founded the Adirondack National Bank in 1897, the first national bank in the Adirondacks. When his health made continued work impossible, he wrote A History of the Adirondacks, a comprehensive two volume history of the park, published in 1921.  Donaldson Mountain, part of the Seward Range, is named for him.

References
 Alfred L Donaldson, A History of the Adirondacks, New York: The Century Co., 1921 (reprinted by Purple Mountain Press, Fleischmanns, NY, 1992)
Lake Placid News, November 9, 1923

1866 births
1923 deaths
American bankers
Historians from New York (state)